Asad Zulfiqar (born 28 March 1997) is a Dutch cricketer. He made his List A debut for the Netherlands against the United Arab Emirates on 17 July 2017. In the match, he played alongside his brothers Saqib and Sikander, becoming the first instance of triplets playing for a professional cricket team in the same game.

In January 2022, Zulfiqar was named in the Dutch One Day International (ODI) squad for their series against Afghanistan in Qatar.

References

External links
 

1997 births
Living people
Dutch cricketers
Place of birth missing (living people)
Triplets
Dutch people of Pakistani descent